Sky Studios is a production company founded by Sky in June 2019 with assets from the now defunct Sky Vision. It develops, produces and funds original drama, comedy and documentary, and has investments in a number of production businesses in the UK and US: Love Productions (wholly owned), Blast Films!, Sugar Films, True North Productions, Chrysalis Vision, True to Nature, Longboat Pictures and The Lighthouse in the United Kingdom; Jupiter Entertainment, Talos Films, Znak & Co. and Catalina Content in the United States.

As part of the launch of Sky Studios, the broadcaster also announced that they would double their spend on original productions to over $1.3 billion over the next five years.

In September 2019, Sky Studios announced they were launching a US-arm called The Hive, based in New York and Tennessee, utilising expertise from Jupiter Entertainment. In December 2021, Sky Studios sold their minority stake in Bad Wolf to Sony Pictures Television.

Sky Studios Elstree
In December 2019, Sky announced plans to develop Sky Studios Elstree. The facility is being built at Rowley Lane, Borehamwood, located close to the existing Elstree Studios. The new studios are expected to open in 2022, and will provide production space for Sky's original content as well as film and TV productions from NBCUniversal, which is owned by Sky's parent company Comcast.

The site is also expected to house post-production facilities and an on-site screening cinema.

Partnerships
Sky Studios has creative partnerships in place with a range of production companies including Merman TV (founded by Sharon Horgan and Clelia Mountford), Rangabee (founded by Romesh Ranganathan and Benjamin Green), The Apartment (part of Fremantle and led by Lorenzo Mieli) and an overall deal with German filmmaker Philipp Leinemann.

Original productions

Upcoming 
Scripted series
Impero (TBC) – for Sky Italia – with Èliseo Entertainment, Sky Italia

Unscripted series
Greenpeace Inside - Mission: Saving the Planet (2022) - for Sky Documentaries (UK) – with M.E. Works, Constantin Dokumentation, Sky UK

Unscripted films

References

Sky Group
Companies based in the London Borough of Hounslow
British companies established in 2019
Mass media companies established in 2019
Television production companies of the United Kingdom
Mass media companies based in London
2019 establishments in England